Marguerite Kerrigan (born July 24, 1931) is a former pitcher and infield/outfield utility who played in the All-American Girls Professional Baseball League. Listed at 5' 9", 150 lb., Kerrigan batted and threw right handed. She was dubbed Kerry by her teammates.

Born in La Crescent, Minnesota, Marguerite Kerrigan played from 1950 through 1952 for the Rockford Peaches, even though she saw limited action. Kerrigan played baseball with her cousins as a child before starting to play organized softball while attending high school. She then attended College of Saint Teresa in Winona, Minnesota, where she played for a local team. At the time, she had a friend In Rockford that told her about the league and convinced her to try out in 1950. The Peaches signed Marguerite, but did not use her much over three seasons.

Afterwards, Kerrigan played for a team sponsored by R. H. Hall in St. Petersburg, Florida that won several state titles. In addition, she worked as a reservation sales agent for Delta Air Lines during 24 years, retiring in 1987. She then moved to Largo, Florida.

The All-American Girls Professional Baseball League folded in 1954, but there is now a permanent display at the Baseball Hall of Fame and Museum at Cooperstown, New York since November 5, 1988 that honors those who were part of the league. Marguerite Kerrigan, along with the rest of the girls and the league staff, is included at the display/exhibit.

Sources

1931 births
Living people
All-American Girls Professional Baseball League players
Rockford Peaches players
Baseball players from Minnesota
College of Saint Teresa alumni
People from La Crescent, Minnesota
People from Largo, Florida
21st-century American women